Lloyd "Rocky" Henry (born April 25, 1975) is a former Canadian football wide receiver in the Canadian Football League who played for the BC Lions, Winnipeg Blue Bombers, and Saskatchewan Roughriders. He played college football for the Utah Utes.

References

1975 births
Living people
American football wide receivers
Canadian football wide receivers
BC Lions players
Winnipeg Blue Bombers players
Saskatchewan Roughriders players
Utah Utes football players